Kings of the Wild Frontier is the second album by English new wave band Adam and the Ants. It  was released on 7 November 1980 by CBS Records in the UK and Epic records internationally. The album was the UK number 1 selling album in 1981 (and the 48th best seller in 1980) and won Best British Album at the 1982 Brit Awards. This album introduced the Burundi beat sound to popular music.

Background and recording
After having his previous backing band wooed away by producer Malcolm McLaren to form Bow Wow Wow, Adam Ant recorded Kings of the Wild Frontier with guitarist Marco Pirroni as his new writing partner.

Release and commercial performance
Kings of the Wild Frontier reached No. 1 in the UK Album Chart and spawned three hit singles: "Kings of the Wild Frontier", which was released in July and reached No. 2 in the UK Singles Chart; "Dog Eat Dog", which reached No. 4; and "Antmusic", released in December and reaching No. 2, as well as No. 1 in Australia for five weeks.

The album was remastered and reissued in 2004 with several bonus tracks.

A multi-disc "Super Deluxe Edition" was released 20 May 2016. It includes a DVD of the long out-of-print Ants in Japan concert video and a CD of a 1981 concert from Chicago. This edition scraped a single week in the UK Album Chart in its own right at number 69 and is considered to be a separate chart hit from the original album (rather than a 67th week for the album as a whole) Ant performed the entire album live on tour in the UK that year, and in the United States, Australia and New Zealand in 2017.

Cover
Photographer Peter Ashworth wrote, "On 5 August 1980, prior to his first slot on Top of the Pops, Adam Ant got the band together in a small rehearsal room in Brixton to create a video test. Shooting stills from the monitor screen during the band performance produced some powerful images. Two days later a repeat shoot from the video recording, in a blacked-out studio, produced the sleeve image..."
The US version of the album dropped "Making History" in favour of two tracks penned by Ant prior to teaming up with Marco Pirroni, "(You're So) Physical" and "Press Darlings".

Reception

Reviewing the US edition for The Village Voice in March 1981, Robert Christgau judged the album as a response to British punk rock nihilism: "The music, needless to say, is rock and roll, a clever pop-punk amalgam boasting two drummers, lots of chanting, and numerous B-movie hooks. Especially given Adam's art-schooled vocals, I find that the hooks grate, but that may just mean that when it comes to futuristic warriors I prefer Sandinistas."

In his retrospective review, Stephen Thomas Erlewine of AllMusic called it "one of the great defining albums of its time. There's simply nothing else like it, nothing else that has the same bravado, the same swagger, the same gleeful self-aggrandizement and sense of camp. This walked a brilliant line between campiness and art-house chutzpah, and it arrived at precisely the right time – at the forefront of new wave". Trouser Press cites it as the album where Adam Ant "found his groove".

Legacy
Kings of the Wild Frontier is included in the book 1001 Albums You Must Hear Before You Die. It is also one of twenty CDs in the Great British Albums box set released by Sony Records in 2012. In 1992, Nine Inch Nails released a cover version of "Physical (You're So)" on the EP Broken, remade in an industrial rock style with more aggressive guitars and vocals than the original. In 2020, Rolling Stone included Kings of the Wild Frontier in their "80 Greatest albums of 1980" list.

Cultural references
The songs on the album reference and quote numerous cultural sources in both lyrics and music. The abiding themes are drawn from a stew of popular, historical and contemporary sources to create an immersive tableau of pop-mythology. The title track evokes Davy Crockett, and media representations thereof, and posits the band and its followers as a new royal family. "Dog Eat Dog" was inspired by a quotation attributed to Margaret Thatcher. "Feed Me To The Lions" includes a musical quotation of the theme from the film Lawrence of Arabia. "Los Rancheros" refers to Clint Eastwood. As well as evoking the film Them!, "Ants Invasion" mentions a 'Forbidden Zone' as in the 1968 film of Planet of the Apes (a theme returned to on the following year's "Picasso Visita el Planeta de los Simios"). "Killer In The Home" quotes Apocalypse Now in its lyrics. "The Magnificent Five" obviously homages The Magnificent Seven, and quotes Friedrich Nietzsche. "Don't Be Square (Be There)" refers to an earlier, unreleased Adam and the Ants song, which itself obliquely referenced the actor Dirk Bogarde. "Jolly Roger" is musically identical with the theme to Seven Guns for the MacGregors, composed by Ennio Morricone. "Making History" quotes Night of the Living Dead. "The Human Beings" lyrical content consists almost entirely of the chanted names of Native American tribes Blackfoot, Pawnee, Cheyenne, Crow, and the name of Goklayeh, a Bedonkohe Apache leader.

Track listing

US version

 US Cassette version

Super Deluxe Edition
On 20 May 2016, Sony Music/Legacy Recordings issued a lavish four disc super deluxe box set of Kings of the Wild Frontier. The box included two CDs, a DVD &  a 180g gold newly remastered vinyl LP.

CD 1

CD 2, Adam & The Ants Live in Chicago, 1981
All tracks mastered by Adam Ant & Walter Coelho. Tracks 1-17 previously unissued on CD. Tracks 19 & 20 previously unreleased.

DVD

Gold Vinyl LP

Personnel
 Adam and the Ants
Adam Ant – vocals, acoustic guitar, piano, harmonica
Marco Pirroni – electric guitar
Kevin Mooney – bass
Merrick (Chris Hughes) – drums, production
Terry Lee Miall – drums
Peter Ashworth – sleeve photography

Chart positions

Weekly charts

Year-end charts

References

External links 
 
 Kings of the Wild Frontier (Adobe Flash) at Radio3Net (streamed copy where licensed)

Adam and the Ants albums
1980 albums
Epic Records albums
Brit Award for British Album of the Year
Albums recorded at Rockfield Studios
Albums produced by Chris Hughes (musician)